Callichilia is a genus of plant in the family Apocynaceae, native to tropical Africa.

Species
, Plants of the World Online accepts these species:
 Callichilia barteri (Hook.f.) Stapf - Togo, Benin, Nigeria, Cameroon, Republic of the Congo, Democratic Republic of the Congo
 Callichilia basileis Beentje - Nigeria, Cameroon 
 Callichilia bequaertii De Wild. - Nigeria, Cameroon, Republic of the Congo, Gabon, Cabinda, Central African Republic, Democratic Republic of the Congo
 Callichilia inaequalis Stapf - Nigeria, Cameroon, Gabon 
 Callichilia monopodialis (K.Schum) Stapf - Nigeria, Cameroon, Republic of the Congo
 Callichilia subsessilis (Benth.) Stapf - Ghana, Guinea, Ivory Coast, Liberia, Sierra Leone, Nigeria, Republic of the Congo

References

 
Apocynaceae genera